The railway from Rennes to Redon is a regional railway line between Rennes and Redon in Ille-et-Vilaine, western France. It's a part of the link between Rennes and Nantes/Quimper.

Route

The line begins in Rennes station and ends in Redon station.

Line history
The line opened on September 21, 1862 with a single track.

References

Railway lines in Brittany